Penicillium murcianum is an anamorph species of the genus Penicillium.

References

Further reading 
 
 

murcianum
Fungi described in 1981